Abel Miguel Suárez Torres (born 11 April 1991) is a Spanish footballer who plays for CD Ebro as a central midfielder.

Club career
Born in Puerto del Rosario, Province of Las Palmas, Suárez finished his development with local CD Tenerife, and made his senior debut with the reserves in the 2010–11 season in the Tercera División. On 4 June 2011 he appeared in his first professional match with the Canary Islands club, starting in a 0–1 home loss against UD Las Palmas in the Segunda División.

On 15 January 2013, Suárez was loaned to Segunda División B side CD Guijuelo. On 20 August, he signed with fellow league team SD Noja also on loan.

Suárez subsequently served another temporary deal at CD Leganés, being promoted to the second division. On 8 August 2014, he signed a new two-year contract with Tenerife and was loaned to La Roda CF for the season.

On 18 June 2015, Suárez was definitely included in Tenerife's first team in division two. After playing only six matches during the first half of the campaign, he terminated his contract on 26 January 2016 and signed for Liga I club ACS Poli Timișoara just hours later.

Suárez returned to his home country on 23 June 2016, signing for Pontevedra CF of the third tier. He continued to compete at that level in the following years, representing in quick succession Burgos CF, Racing de Ferrol and Real Balompédica Linense.

On 7 January 2019, Suárez joined FC Honka of the Finnish Veikkausliiga.

References

External links

1991 births
Living people
Spanish footballers
Footballers from the Canary Islands
Association football midfielders
Segunda División players
Segunda División B players
Tercera División players
CD Tenerife B players
CD Tenerife players
CD Guijuelo footballers
CD Leganés players
La Roda CF players
Pontevedra CF footballers
Burgos CF footballers
Racing de Ferrol footballers
Real Balompédica Linense footballers
CF Badalona players
UD Socuéllamos players
CD Ebro players
Liga I players
ACS Poli Timișoara players
Veikkausliiga players
FC Honka players
Spanish expatriate footballers 
Expatriate footballers in Romania
Expatriate footballers in Finland
Spanish expatriate sportspeople in Romania
Spanish expatriate sportspeople in Finland